The Stade du Vivier d'Oie (Dutch: De Ganzenvijver, English translation: Goose Pond Stadium) is a stadium in the Belgian community of Uccle in the Brussels Capital Region. The stadium lies in the quarter Vivier d'Oie (Dutch: Diesdelle) at the margin of the Soignies Forest. In the first half of the 20th century the football club Racing Club de Bruxelles played here.

History
Racing club was founded at the end of the 19th century and played first in Koekelberg and then at the velodrome of Longchamps at Longchamps in Uccle. In 1901 the club was successful and it was decided to move to Vivier d'Oie. On a location on the outskirts of the Soignies Forest a stadium with side building and a club house were built. The main stand was made in armoured concrete, an innovating technique  which was only used in England at that moment. It was one of the first covered tribunes that was not made of wood. The stadium was opened in 1902, and at 1 May 1904 the Belgium national team played its first official football match against France (3–3). After the First World War it also became a sports ground for field hockey. In 1923 a cottage was built, designed by Uccle's architect Fritz Seeldraeyers. During the Interbellum the decorated concrete entrance gate was made with the inscription "ROYAL RACING CLUB DE BRUXELLES".

After the Second World War the football section of the club played in the highest division again, and the stadium became too small for the club. Therefore, the athletic and football sections moved to the newly constructed Drie Linden Stadion in Watermael-Boitsfort. After financial challenges, the football section separated itself in 1963 from Racing Club de Bruxelles and merged with another club. The hockey section and tennis section kept playing in the Stade du Vivier d'Oie. In 1963 a new club house was built.

In 2010 the Belgian government assigned the sports complex as a protected monument.

References

External links
 Article about Stadion De Ganzenvijver on www.deheldenvanleon.be - Groundhop page with photographic materials from the Drie Linden Stadium and the Stade du Vivier d'Oie
 Vergane Glorie - Stadion de Ganzenvijver - History and photo materials about the Stade du Vivier d'Oie

Sports venues completed in 1902
Football venues in Brussels
Uccle
Royal Racing Club Bruxelles